Ernst Pahl (born September 21, 1860 in Germany) was a member of the Wisconsin State Assembly. He later moved to Milwaukee, Wisconsin.

Career
Pahl was elected to the Assembly in 1924. He was a Republican.

References

German emigrants to the United States
Politicians from Milwaukee
Republican Party members of the Wisconsin State Assembly
1860 births
Year of death missing